The Fredrikstad Eagles is an American football team based in Fredrikstad, Norway. They are former members of the Norway American Football Federation (NoAFF).

First season
The Eagles played their first season in 1992 in the 1st division. They set a new league record with the biggest loss, losing 99-0 to Westside Vikings (Now Oslo Vikings). They also managed to get the smallest loss possible, losing 2-0 on a safety against the Larvik Lions.

Later seasons
In the 1993 season they played in the 2nd division. That year they played the first competitive game on gravel (grus) against the Kristiandsand Raiders, who were not aware of the fact that grass or Astroturf is the preferred playing surface. The Fredrikstad Eagles still managed to win the game 6-66 after the Raiders had a 6-0 lead.

Other results that year were a 28-22 loss to the Sandnes Oilers, and a 28-0 loss to the Nidaros Domers.

Players
Famous players: Jan Vidar Jacobsen (born September 6, 1970), who played Inside Linebacker, Defensive Line and Center.
Played two seasons for Fredrikstad Eagles.

Had one tryout game for Barcelona Dragons against Stuttgart

Made comeback February 2010 for the Oslo Vikings playing as a Defensive Tackle, but suffered season-ending injuries in a pre-season trainingsession, where he broke his left collarbone and two ribs on the right side.

American football teams in Norway
Sport in Fredrikstad
1992 establishments in Norway
American football teams established in 1992